National Economic Council, Inc. was an American conservative political organization, headed for much of its history by Merwin K. Hart.

The organization was established in 1931 as the New York State Economic Council, with the aims of reducing U.S. government expenditures and taxes. In 1943, it changed its name to the National Economic Council.

Positions of the New York State Economic Council and the National Economic Council, Inc., included  opposition to U.S. President Franklin Roosevelt and support for Francisco Franco's fascist leadership in Spain. Several newsletters of the National Economic Council expressed antisemitic views, stating that American Jews were "alien-minded" and were undermining American government through "deceit", "trickery", and "intimidation". In 1947, the organization sent letters to many trustees of American universities and colleges that attacked Keynesian economics as a form of Marxism and denounced the textbook Elements of Economics, by Lorie Tarshis, for endorsing Keynesianism.

Notable writers affiliated with the National Economic Council included Rose Wilder Lane,  daughter of Laura Ingalls Wilder.  One of the seminal influencers of the mid-20th Century Libertarian political movement, Lane served as an editor and book reviewer from 1945-1952.

The organization was included on President Richard Nixon's "enemies list".

See also

 Merwin K. Hart
 Rose Wilder Lane

Notes

References

James T. Harris (1951). The political philosophy of the National Economic Council, Inc. Amherst College
Yale Divinity Library Guide to the Social Ethics Pamphlet Collection: National Economic Council, Inc. New York, NY. 1943, 1960-1961 Economic policy. International organization. Labor movement. Box 26 Folder 2. Newsletters and pamphlet reflecting conservative outlook of the Council on various issues.

Antisemitism in the United States
Far-right organizations in the United States
National Economic Council, Inc.